Archibald Miller (5 September 1913 – 14 July 2006) was a Scottish footballer, who played for Heart of Midlothian, Falkirk (wartime guest), Blackburn Rovers, Kilmarnock, Carlisle United, Workington and Scotland.

References

Sources

External links

London Hearts profile (Scotland)
London Hearts profile (Scottish League)

1913 births
2006 deaths
Scottish footballers
Association football wing halves
Scotland international footballers
Heart of Midlothian F.C. players
Falkirk F.C. wartime guest players
Blackburn Rovers F.C. players
Kilmarnock F.C. players
Carlisle United F.C. players
Workington A.F.C. players
Scottish Football League players
Scottish Football League representative players
English Football League players
Scottish football managers
Workington A.F.C. managers
English Football League managers
Scotland wartime international footballers